Balestier Khalsa Football Club is a Singaporean professional football club that competes in the Singapore Premier League. Founded in 1898, the club is considered as the oldest football club in the country.

History
Tracing their origins all the way back to 1898, the club was formed as Fathul Karib and based in Farrer Park. One of the highlights over the following half century, before the side was renamed Balestier United Recreation Club in the 1970s, was providing nine players to the Singapore side which competed in the 1958 Asian Games, losing 2–1 to both continental heavyweights South Korea and Israel.

Balestier United Recreational Club

The club's name was changed to Awne F.C in April 1975, when it joined the inaugural National Football League. The team captured the Singapore Cup in 1958 and 1992. The club played in the Singapore Premier League (the forerunner to the S.League) from 1988 to 1995. The club became the first club in Singapore to bring in foreign players when they signed two Yugoslavian players, Josko Spanjic and Boris Lucic, for the 1989 season. Balestier United are currently still active in local football, competing in the National Football League Division 1. Former Balestier Khalsa players such, Ruhaizad Ismail, Daniel Ong and Syafiq Zainal all played for the team as well.

Balestier Central
In 1996, Balestier United Recreational Club became a founder member of the S.League and changed its name to Balestier Central.

Clementi Khalsa

Clementi Khalsa was formed as a club to represent Singapore's Sikh community and joined the S.League in 1999. Prior to the merger with Balestier Central, the club was based in the Clementi area of Singapore and played its home games at the Clementi Stadium.

Merger
The club is an amalgamation of Balestier Central Football Club and Clementi Khalsa Football Club who merged at the end of the 2002 S.League season. Due to its link with Clementi Khalsa, the club is very popular amongst Singapore's Sikh community.

Balestier Khalsa
On 10 August 2012, Balestier Khalsa won the first League Cup Plate Final as the team defeated Young Lions in the Jalan Besar Stadium.

In 2013, Darren Stewart signed several players from his former team, Gombak United and formed a strong foundation of the team, including foreign players Kim Min-ho and Park Kang-jin, together with Singapore national team player Qiu Li and proved to be a success. On 14 September 2013, The Tigers went one level higher by scoring a huge 4–0 win over DPMM FC in the League Cup Final and clinched their first ever silverware. Captain, Paul Cunningham and the team lift the trophy as well as clinching 3rd placing in the Singapore Cup.

Balestier Khalsa signed former U-21 Croatian international Goran Ljubojević on 11 February 2014 as their first ever marquee signing. As well as Emir Lotinac of Serbia from Novi Pazar. The Tigers won their first ever Singapore Cup on 7 November 2014, beating Home United 3–1 with Goran, Kim and Park scoring the goals. Thus, qualified for AFC Cup in the following year.

The Tigers make their continental competition debut on 24 February 2015, losing 0–3 to Hong Kong Premier League champions, Kitchee. 10 March, they almost held eventual 2015 champions, Johor Darul Ta'zim to goalless draw but the visitor scored in the stoppage time. Balestier Khalsa finally got their historical first win in the following week, Jonathan Xu scoring his and Tiger's maiden AFC Cup goal and Miroslav Krištić's goal beating East Bengal 2–1. On 10 July 2015, Balestier Khalsa lost narrowly 2–1 against Albirex Niigata (S) to finish runner up in the League Cup.

In 2016, Balestier Khalsa qualified for AFC Cup as Singapore's 2nd best local team and got their first away goals/ point in the AFC Cup, held Dhivehi Premier League champions, New Radiant 2–2 at Malé. They continue to improved their run in the competition and winning Kitchee & New Radiant 1–0 and 3–0 at home. Balestier Khalsa finished 4th in the Singapore Cup after losing to Ceres-La Salle in the third place playoff.

In 2017, due to tight budget, Balestier Khalsa signed 3 Myanmar national football team players, Aung Kyaw Naing, Kyaw Zayar Win, Nanda Lin Kyaw Chit from Nay Pyi Taw, Ayeyawady United and Yadanabon respectively.

Players
 

U23

U23

U23
U23

U23

U21
U21
U21
U21

Remarks:

On Loan

 (National Service till 2023, to Young Lions FC)
 (National Service till 2023)
 (National Service till 2024)

 (National Service till 2024)
 (National Service till 2025, to Young Lions FC)

Club staff

Honours
 Singapore Cup
 Winners: 2014
 Community Shield
 Runners-up: 2015
 League Cup
 Winners: 2013
 Runners-up: 2015
 League Cup Plate Tournament
 Winners: 2012
 Runners-up : 2014
 FA Cup
 Winners: 2012
 President's Cup
 Winners: 1992
 FAS Challenge Cup
 Winners: 1958

Reserves
 Prime League
 Winners: 2012, 2013

Domestic record
As Balestier Central/ Balestier Khalsa

As Clementi Khalsa

 The 1996 season of the S.League was split into two series. 
 2003 saw the introduction of penalty shoot-outs if a match ended in a draw in regular time. Winners of penalty shoot-outs gained two points instead of one.

Continental record

Sponsors

See also

 History of Singaporean Indians
 History of Indian influence on Southeast Asia
 Indian diaspora
 Indian Singaporeans
 Sikhism in Singapore
 Singapore Khalsa Association FC
 List of Indian organisations in Singapore

References

External links
 Official club website
 S.League website page on Balestier Khalsa FC

 
Football clubs in Singapore
Association football clubs established in 1898
1898 establishments in Singapore
Singapore Premier League clubs